Tanya Holliday (born 21 September 1988) is an Australian race walker. She competed in the women's 20 kilometres walk event at the 2016 Summer Olympics. In 2016, she finished in 15th place in the women's 20 km walk at the 2016 IAAF World Race Walking Team Championships held in Rome, Italy.

References

External links
 

1988 births
Living people
Australian female racewalkers
Place of birth missing (living people)
Athletes (track and field) at the 2016 Summer Olympics
Olympic athletes of Australia
20th-century Australian women
21st-century Australian women